Michael G. Bellotti (born March 21, 1963) is an American politician who is the current Norfolk County Treasurer. He is the former interim president of Quincy College, the former sheriff of Norfolk County, Massachusetts, and is a former member of the Massachusetts House of Representatives from Quincy. He is the son of Francis X. Bellotti, the state's former lieutenant governor and attorney general.

Bellotti is a graduate of Boston College (A.B.) and New England School of Law (J.D.)

References

1963 births
Politicians from Brookline, Massachusetts
Democratic Party members of the Massachusetts House of Representatives
Politicians from Quincy, Massachusetts
Boston College alumni
Living people
County treasurers of Norfolk County, Massachusetts
County treasurers in Massachusetts
High Sheriffs of Norfolk County